Alexander Johnston Hall is a historic building located on the corner of Somerset Street and College Avenue, New Brunswick in Middlesex County, New Jersey and is the second oldest building on the campus of Rutgers University. It was built in 1830 to handle the expansion of the Rutgers Preparatory School and the two literary societies, Philoclean and Peithessophian. The building, described using its historic name, Rutgers Preparatory School, was added to the National Register of Historic Places on July 18, 1975 for its significance in architecture and education.

History
Designed by local architect and builder Nicholas Wyckoff in 1830, Alexander Johnston Hall served as the home of the Rutgers College Grammar School, later known as the Rutgers Preparatory School. In 1870, the Rutgers College trustees hired architect Henry Janeway Hardenbergh (1847–1918) to design a two-story addition for the building. It was the first of three commissions Hardenbergh designed for the college—the other two being Geology Hall (1872) and Kirkpatrick Chapel.  The Rutgers Preparatory School used this building from 1830 to 1963.  The school, which was chartered with Rutgers as "Queen's College" in 1766, is now an independent school located on a 45-acre campus on Easton Avenue in Somerset, New Jersey. In 1964, the university renamed the building to honor 1870 graduate,  Alexander Johnston, a historian and classics instructor at the school. Johnston had taught future Rutgers president William H. S. Demarest here.

See also
 Queens Campus
 Voorhees Mall

References

External links
 Rutgers, The State University of New Jersey (official website)
 Rutgers Preparatory School (official website)

Rutgers University buildings
Henry Janeway Hardenbergh buildings
National Register of Historic Places in Middlesex County, New Jersey
School buildings completed in 1830
Buildings and structures in New Brunswick, New Jersey
Italianate architecture in New Jersey
Second Empire architecture in New Jersey
1830 establishments in New Jersey
New Jersey Register of Historic Places
University and college buildings on the National Register of Historic Places in New Jersey